Countess Anna Sibylle of Hanau-Lichtenberg (16 May 1542 – 5 January 1580) was a German noblewoman. She was born in Lichtenberg, the eldest surviving daughter of Count Philipp IV (20 May 1512 – 19 February 1590) and his wife, Countess Eleonore of Fürstenberg (11 October 1523 – 26 April 1544).

Marriage and issue 
Anna Sibylle married on 12 October 1562  to Louis of Fleckenstein-Dagstuhl (1542-1577).  They had a son:
 Philip Wolfgang of Fleckenstein-Dagstuhl (d. 1618). Married to 1 Alexandra of Rappoltstein (15 March 1565 – 9 April 1610).
 Georg II of Fleckenstein-Dagstuhl (1588-1644), regent of Hanau, last of the Fleckenstein-Dagstuhl line. Married to Maria Magdalena of Hohensachsen (d. after 1628).

Legacy 
This marriage proved to be important to the history of the House of Hanau and the counties of Hanau-Münzenberg and Hanau-Lichtenberg, because her grandson Georg II of Fleckenstein-Dagstuhl played a major role during the final phase of the Thirty Years' War.  He acted as regent for the underage count Friedrich Casimir, Count of Hanau-Lichtenberg, Hanau-Lichtenberg from 1641 to 1647 and in Hanau-Münzneberg from 1642 to 1647.  Georg II achieved the reunification of the two parts of Hanau, despite resistance of the Landgrave of Hesse-Kassel, who was the liege lord of Hanau-Münzenberg.

Ancestors

References 
 Reinhard Dietrich: Die Landesverfassung in dem Hanauischen, in the series Hanauer Geschichtsblätter, vol. 34, Hanau, 1996, 
 Wilhelm Morhardt: Hanau alt's - in Ehren b'halt's — Die Grafen von Hanau-Lichtenberg in Geschichte und Geschichten, in the series Babenhausen einst und jetzt, vol. 10, Babenhausen, 1984
 Detlev Schwennicke: Europäische Stammtafeln: Stammtafeln zur Geschichte der Europäischen Staaten, new series, vol. VII, table 26
 Reinhard Suchier: Genealogie des Hanauer Grafenhauses, in: Festschrift des Hanauer Geschichtsvereins zu seiner fünfzigjährigen Jubelfeier am 27. August 1894, Hanau, 1894
 Ernst J. Zimmermann: Hanau Stadt und Land, 3rd ed., Hanau, 1919, reprinted 1978

Footnotes 

House of Hanau
People from Saverne
1542 births
1580 deaths
16th-century German people